Jones Gully is a rural locality in the Toowoomba Region, Queensland, Australia. In the  Jones Gully had a population of 14 people.

History 
Jones Gully State School opened circa 1932 and closed circa 1955.

In the  Jones Gully had a population of 14 people.

References 

Toowoomba Region
Localities in Queensland